Syedi Fakhruddin Shaheed is the 11th-century holy Ismaili, Fatimid, mustaali saint who was first Ismaili martyr, martyred during missionary work among Bhils local tribal in Rajasthan and buried in Galiakot, India. The mausoleum is the most venerated place amongst his followers.

Family
Syedi Fakhruddin was the son of Jain Raja Tarmal. Raja Tarmal and his brother Raja Bharmal were the first converts by Moulaya Abdullah. Raja Tarmal and Raja Bharmal were ministers of Jayasimha Siddharaja. Syedi Fakhruddin had a son called Moulaya Dawood who is buried in the vicinity of Syedi Fakhruddin's mausoleum.

Life
Syedi Fakhruddin was given responsibility of conducting religious affairs in present day Rajasthan by Moulaya Yaqub, son of Raja Bharmal and representative of Iman Mustansir in India.

Death
On his way from Sagwara to Galiakot, while conducting religious affairs, Syedi Fakhruddin was attacked and killed by a group of brigands on the outskirts of Galiakot.

Mausoleum
The mausoleum of Syedi Fakhruddin was first constructed in 1829 by Syedna Tayyeb Zainuddin, was again renovated by Syedna Taher Saifuddin in 1954 and reconstructed by Syedna Mohammed Burhanuddin.

Lineage
Syedi Fakhruddin is the ancestor of nine Dawoodi Bohra Dais: Syedna Mohammed Ezzuddin, Syedna Tayyeb Zainuddin, Syedna Abdul Qadir Najmuddin, Syedna Abdul Husain Husamuddin, Syedna Mohammed Burhanuddin I, Syedna Abdullah Badruddin, Syedna Taher Saifuddin, Syedna Mohammed Burhanuddin, and Syedna Mufaddal Saifuddin. He is also the ancestor of Syedi Shams Khan (buried in Surat) and Syedi Hasan-ji Badshah (buried in Ujjain).

Photo gallery

See also
Isma'ilism
Mustaali

References

11th-century deaths
Musta'li Isma'ilism
Indian Muslims
Ismaili da'is
11th-century Ismailis